The Spy Paramount is a 1934 spy thriller novel by the British writer E. Phillips Oppenheim. It was republished in 2014 by British Library Publishing.

Synopsis
An American Martin Fawley in Rome is recruited by Fascist Italy's spy chief General Berati to go undercover in a mission that takes him to Nice and Monte Carlo. Fawley, a veteran of the First World War is eager to take part in a plan that will try and secure world peace and prevent any future war.

References

Bibliography
 Reilly, John M. Twentieth Century Crime & Mystery Writers. Springer, 2015.
 Simonetti, Paolo & Rossi, Umberto. Dream Tonight of Peacock Tails: Essays on the Fiftieth Anniversary of Thomas Pynchon’s V. Cambridge Scholars Publishing, 2015.

1934 British novels
Novels by E. Phillips Oppenheim
British thriller novels
British spy novels
Novels set in Rome
Novels set in France
Novels set in London
Novels set in Monaco
Hodder & Stoughton books
Little, Brown and Company books